Ajax ( Aias means "of the earth".) was a Greek mythological hero, son of Oileus, the king of Locris.  He was called the "lesser" or "Locrian" Ajax, to distinguish him from Ajax the Great, son of Telamon. He was the leader of the Locrian contingent during the Trojan War. He is a significant figure in Homer's Iliad and is also mentioned in the Odyssey, in Virgil's Aeneid and in Euripides' The Trojan Women. In Etruscan legend, he was known as Aivas Vilates.

Description 
In the account of Dares the Phrygian, Ajax was described as "stocky, powerfully built, swarthy, a pleasant person, and brave."

Mythology

Life 

Ajax's mother's name was Eriopis. According to Strabo, he was born in Naryx in Locris, where Ovid calls him Narycius heros.  According to the Iliad, he led his Locrians in forty ships against Troy.  He is described as one of the great heroes among the Greeks. In battle, he wore a linen cuirass, was brave and intrepid, especially skilled in throwing the spear and, next to Achilles, the swiftest of all the Greeks. The chronicler Malalas portrayed him as "tall, strong, tawny, squinting, good nose, curly hair, black hair, thick beard, long face, daring warrior, magnanimous, a womanizer."

In the funeral games at the pyre of Patroclus, Ajax contended with Odysseus and Antilochus for the prize in the footrace; but Athena, who was hostile towards him and favored Odysseus, made him stumble and fall, so that he won only the second prize.

In later traditions, this Ajax is called a son of Oileus and the nymph Rhene and is also mentioned among the suitors of Helen. After the taking of Troy, he rushed into the temple of Athena, where Cassandra had taken refuge, and was embracing the statue of the goddess in supplication. Ajax violently dragged her away to the other captives.  According to some writers, he raped Cassandra inside the temple. Odysseus called for Ajax's death by stoning for this crime, but Ajax saved himself by claiming innocence with an oath to Athena, clutching her statue in supplication.

Death 
Since Ajax dragged the supplicant from her temple, Athena had cause to be indignant. According to the Bibliotheca, no one was aware that Ajax had raped Cassandra until Calchas, the Greek seer, warned the Greeks that Athena was furious at the treatment of her priestess and she would destroy the Greek ships if they did not kill him immediately. Despite this, Ajax managed to hide at the altar of a deity where the Greeks, fearing divine retribution should they kill him and destroy the altar, allowed him to live. When the Greeks left without killing Ajax, despite their sacrifices, Athena became so angry that she persuaded Zeus to send a storm that sank many of their ships.

As he was returning from Troy, Athena hit his ship with a thunderbolt and the vessel was wrecked on the Whirling Rocks. But he escaped with some of his men, managing to cling onto a rock through the assistance of Poseidon. He would have been saved in spite of Athena, but he then audaciously declared that he would escape the dangers of the sea in defiance of the immortals. Offended by this presumption, Poseidon split the rock with his trident and Ajax was swallowed up by the sea. Thetis buried him when the corpse washed up on Mykonos. Other versions depict a different death for Ajax, showing him dying when on his voyage home. In these versions, when Ajax came to the Capharean Rocks on the coast of Euboea, his ship was wrecked in a fierce storm, he himself was lifted up in a whirlwind and impaled with a flash of rapid fire from Athena in his chest, and his body thrust upon sharp rocks, which afterwards were called the rocks of Ajax.

After Ajax's death, his spirit dwelt in the island of Leuce. The Opuntian Locrians worshipped Ajax as their national hero, and so great was their faith in him that when they drew up their army in battle, they always left one place open for him, believing that, although invisible to them, he was fighting for and among them.  The story of Ajax was frequently made use of by ancient poets and artists, and the hero who appears on some Locrian coins with the helmet, shield, and sword is probably this Ajax.

Other accounts of Ajax's death are offered by Philostratus and the scholiast on Lycophron.

Art

The abduction of Cassandra by Ajax was frequently represented in Greek works of art, such as the chest of Cypselus described by Pausanias and in extant works.

Notes

References 

 Apollodorus, The Library with an English Translation by Sir James George Frazer, F.B.A., F.R.S. in 2 Volumes, Cambridge, MA, Harvard University Press; London, William Heinemann Ltd. 1921. . Online version at the Perseus Digital Library. Greek text available from the same website.
 Conon, Fifty Narrations, surviving as one-paragraph summaries in the Bibliotheca (Library) of Photius, Patriarch of Constantinople translated from the Greek by Brady Kiesling. Online version at the Topos Text Project.
Dictys Cretensis, from The Trojan War. The Chronicles of Dictys of Crete and Dares the Phrygian translated by Richard McIlwaine Frazer, Jr.  Indiana University Press. 1966. Online version at the Topos Text Project.
 Gaius Julius Hyginus, Fabulae from The Myths of Hyginus translated and edited by Mary Grant. University of Kansas Publications in Humanistic Studies. Online version at the Topos Text Project.
 Graves, Robert, The Greek Myths, Harmondsworth, London, England, Penguin Books, 1960. 
 Graves, Robert, The Greek Myths: The Complete and Definitive Edition. Penguin Books Limited. 2017. 
 Homer, The Iliad with an English Translation by A.T. Murray, Ph.D. in two volumes. Cambridge, MA., Harvard University Press; London, William Heinemann, Ltd. 1924. . Online version at the Perseus Digital Library.
 Homer, Homeri Opera in five volumes. Oxford, Oxford University Press. 1920. . Greek text available at the Perseus Digital Library.
 Homer, The Odyssey with an English Translation by A.T. Murray, PH.D. in two volumes. Cambridge, MA., Harvard University Press; London, William Heinemann, Ltd. 1919. . Online version at the Perseus Digital Library. Greek text available from the same website.
Lycophron, The Alexandra  translated by Alexander William Mair. Loeb Classical Library Volume 129. London: William Heinemann, 1921. Online version at the Topos Text Project.
Lycophron, Alexandra translated by A.W. Mair. London: William Heinemann; New York: G.P. Putnam's Sons. 1921. Greek text available at the Perseus Digital Library.
Pausanias, Description of Greece with an English Translation by W.H.S. Jones, Litt.D., and H.A. Ormerod, M.A., in 4 Volumes. Cambridge, MA, Harvard University Press; London, William Heinemann Ltd. 1918. . Online version at the Perseus Digital Library
Pausanias, Graeciae Descriptio. 3 vols. Leipzig, Teubner. 1903.  Greek text available at the Perseus Digital Library.
Publius Ovidius Naso, Metamorphoses translated by Brookes More. Boston, Cornhill Publishing Co. 1922. Online version at the Perseus Digital Library.
Publius Ovidius Naso, Metamorphoses. Hugo Magnus. Gotha (Germany). Friedr. Andr. Perthes. 1892. Latin text available at the Perseus Digital Library.
Publius Vergilius Maro, Aeneid. Theodore C. Williams. trans. Boston. Houghton Mifflin Co. 1910. Online version at the Perseus Digital Library.
Publius Vergilius Maro, Bucolics, Aeneid, and Georgics. J. B. Greenough. Boston. Ginn & Co. 1900. Latin text available at the Perseus Digital Library.
Quintus Smyrnaeus, The Fall of Troy translated by Way. A. S. Loeb Classical Library Volume 19. London: William Heinemann, 1913. Online version at theio.com
Quintus Smyrnaeus, The Fall of Troy. Arthur S. Way. London: William Heinemann; New York: G.P. Putnam's Sons. 1913. Greek text available at the Perseus Digital Library.
Strabo, The Geography of Strabo. Edition by H.L. Jones. Cambridge, Mass.: Harvard University Press; London: William Heinemann, Ltd. 1924. Online version at the Perseus Digital Library.
Strabo, Geographica edited by A. Meineke. Leipzig: Teubner. 1877. Greek text available at the Perseus Digital Library.
Tryphiodorus, Capture of Troy translated by Mair, A. W. Loeb Classical Library Volume 219. London: William Heinemann Ltd, 1928. Online version at theoi.com
Tryphiodorus, Capture of Troy with an English Translation by A.W. Mair. London, William Heinemann, Ltd.; New York: G.P. Putnam's Sons. 1928. Greek text available at the Perseus Digital Library.
Tzetzes, John, Allegories of the Iliad translated by Goldwyn, Adam J. and Kokkini, Dimitra. Dumbarton Oaks Medieval Library, Harvard University Press, 2015.

External links

Suitors of Helen
Achaean Leaders
Mythological rapists
Metamorphoses characters
Characters in the Aeneid
Locrians
Deeds of Poseidon